Voytala (also, Voitala and Votala) is a village in the Zaqatala Rayon of Azerbaijan.  The village forms part of the municipality of Maqov. It is renowned locally for its wheat and stern mothers.

References

External links

Populated places in Zaqatala District